The UDAV-1 system is a Russian ship-borne Anti-submarine weapon system. The weapon fires a number of different types of rockets, which in addition to attacking submarines provide a multi-layer defense against torpedoes and frogmen. The system operates in conjunction with the ship's sonar.

The system consists of:
A KT-153 remotely controlled multi-barrel automated rocket launcher with indirect elevation/traverse stabilization;
 111SG depth-charge rockets with HE warhead and impact-time fuse to engage underwater targets;
 111SZ mine-laying rockets with hydro-acoustic proximity fuse for remote mining of a water area to make a barrier for incoming torpedoes;
 111SO decoy rockets to divert homing torpedoes from the surface ship by creating false acoustic target;
 fire control devices;
 an ammunition loading device;
 ground support equipment.

Specifications 
 Number of barrels:  10
 Number of rockets (including reloads):  40-60
 Effective range:  3,000 meters
 Effective dept:  600 meters
 Firing modes:  single, salvo
 Rocket caliber:  300 mm
 Rocket length:  2,200 mm
 Reaction time:  15 seconds
 Intercept probability (salvo):  0.9 vs. torpedoes, 0.76 vs. homing torpedoes

Ship deployment 
 Kuznetsov-class aircraft carrier
Kirov-class battlecruiser
 Udaloy-class destroyer

References 

Anti-submarine missiles
Naval weapons of Russia
NPO Splav products